The IEC 62196 Type 2 connector (often referred to as Mennekes for the company that designed it) is used for charging electric vehicles, mainly within Europe, as it was declared standard by the EU. Based on widespread red IEC 60309 three phase plugs with five pins, which come in different diameters according to maximum current (most common are 16 A and 32 A), a single size was selected, as maximum possible power will be communicated to the car via two additional communication pins and by a simple resistor coding within the cable. The onboard charger inside the car has to limit the current accordingly. 

The connector is circular in shape, with a flattened top edge; the original design specification carried an output electric power of 3–50 kW for charging battery electric vehicles using single-phase (230V) or three-phase (400V) alternating current (AC), with a typical maximum of 32 A 7.2 kW using single-phase AC and 22 kW with three-phase AC in common practice. The plugs have openings on the sides that allow both the car and the charger to lock the plug automatically to prevent unwanted interruption of charging, or theft of the cable.

As modified by Tesla for its European Supercharger network (up to Version 2), it is capable of outputting 150 kW using direct current (DC) via two pins each, with a switch inside the Tesla Model S or X car selecting the required mode. Since 2019 and the V3 Superchargers, Tesla has adopted the standard CCS2 connector in Europe and the European Model 3 and Y.

History, overview, and peer connectors
The Type 2 connector system was originally proposed by Mennekes in 2009. The system was later tested and standardised by the German Association of the Automotive Industry (VDA) as VDE-AR-E 2623-2-2, and subsequently recommended by the European Automobile Manufacturers Association (ACEA) in 2011. In January 2013, the IEC 62196 Type 2 connector was selected by the European Commission as official AC charging plug within the European Union. It has since been adopted as the recommended connector in most countries worldwide, including New Zealand. When passing AC, the maximum power of the Mennekes connector is 43 kW. The IEC 62196 Type 1 connector (codified under SAE J1772) is the corresponding standard for single-phase AC charging in the United States, Canada, and South Korea. J1772 has a maximum output of 19.2 kW.

In North America, the same Type 2 physical connector is used for three-phase AC charging under the SAE J3068 standard, which uses Local Interconnect Network (LIN) for control signaling based on IEC 61851-1 Edition 3 Annex D. J3068 increases the maximum output to 166 kW using three-phase AC.

The same physical connector is also used in China under the Guobiao standard GB/T 20234.2-2015 for AC-charging, with gender differences for the vehicle and electric vehicle supply equipment. GB/T 20234-2 specifies cables with Type 2-style male connectors on both ends, and a female inlet on vehicles—the opposite gender to the rest of the world, and with different control signalling.

The Combined Charging System Combo 2 "fast charging" connector uses the signaling and protective earth pins of the Type 2 connector and adds two pins for rapid charging, with direct current power supplied at rates up to approximately 350 kW.

Description

As specified by IEC 62196, cars are fitted with a standardised male vehicle inlet, whilst charging stations are fitted with a female socket outlet, either directly on the outside of the charging station, or via a flexible cable with permanently attached connector on the end. When the charging station is equipped with a permanently fixed cable, the connector end of the cable can be attached directly into the vehicle inlet, similar to using a petrol pump and when no fixed cable is available, a separate male-to-female cable is used to connect the vehicle, either using the charging station, or from a traditional IEC 60309-2 industrial connector.

The Type 2 connector system was originally proposed by Mennekes in 2009 leading to the colloquial name of Mennekes.  The system was later tested and standardised by the German Association of the Automotive Industry (VDA) as VDE-AR-E 2623-2-2, and subsequently recommended by the European Automobile Manufacturers Association (ACEA) in 2011.  , Type 2 is intended to replace the previous vehicle connectors used for AC charging within the European electric vehicle network, displacing both Type 1 (SAE J1772) and Type 3 (EV Plug Alliance Types 3A and 3C; colloquially, Scame) connectors. For DC charging, the Combo 2 socket (Type 2 supplemented with 2 DC pins) shall become standard in cars, replacing Type 4 CHAdeMO. The transition period is scheduled to last until 2020.

The IEC 62196 Type 2 connector is used in a slightly modified form for all European Tesla Model S and Model X vehicles, and the European Tesla Supercharger network. As of 2017 Tesla is the only automaker which offers charging with alternating current and direct current based on the IEC 62196-2 specification. For charging with direct current the specification IEC 62196-3 Combined Charging System (CCS) is favored in Europe.

Pins

The connectors contain seven contact places: two small and five larger.  The top row consists of two small contacts for signalling, the middle row contains three pins, the centre pin is used for Earthing, while the outer two pins used for the power supply, optionally in conjunction with the two pins on the bottom row which are also for power supply.  Three pins are always used for the same purposes:

 Proximity pilot (PP): pre-insertion signalling
 Control pilot (CP): post-insertion signalling
 Protective earth (PE): full-current protective earthing system— diameter

The allocation of the four normal power supply pins vary depending on the mode of operation.  They are allocated as:

Some vehicle inlets may contain the extra connections to allow the CCS DC-only charger (high-current DC) to be inserted.

Communication takes place over the CP/PP signalling pins between the charger, cable, and vehicle to ensure that the highest common denominator of voltage and current is selected.

The signalling protocol is identical to that of Type 1 connectors as described in the SAE J1772 standard.

Gallery

See also
 IEC 62196, for information about the specification
 CHAdeMO and CCS Combo, for rapid charging.
 SAE J1772, or Type 1 connector, the equivalent AC connector used in North America, South Korea and Japan
 OpenEVSE

References

International Electrotechnical Commission
Electrical power connectors
DC power connectors
Plug-in hybrid vehicle industry
Charging stations
Automotive standards